David Mkhonto  is a South African Navy officer, serving as Chief Director: Maritime Strategy.

Military career

Mkhonto joined Umkhonto we Sizwe (the military wing of the Africa National Congress) in 1988 and joined the Navy on integration in 1994.

In February 2009 after attending the South African National War College in Tshwane, he was appointed as Officer Commanding Fleet Maintenance Unit Simon's Town, reporting to Director Fleet Logistics, from 1 January 2010.

R Adm (JG) Mkhonto was appointed as Flag Officer Commanding on 1 April 2012 before being appointed Director Fleet Logistics from March 2015.

He took over as Chief Director Maritime Strategy from the 1st of April 2018.

Awards and decorations

References

South African admirals
Living people
1969 births